Robert Jayne (born July 16, 1973), also known as Bobby Jacoby, is an American actor, real estate developer and professional blackjack player.

Career
Starting his career as a child actor, he has appeared in many television series as well as films. His television credits include: Perfect Strangers, Knots Landing, The Greatest American Hero, St. Elsewhere, Manimal, The Love Boat, Highway to Heaven, Murder She Wrote, Diff'rent Strokes, Who's the Boss?, T.J. Hooker, The A-Team, Cagney and Lacey, Hill Street Blues, The Wonder Years, Jake and the Fatman, Land of the Lost, Walker Texas Ranger, Baywatch, Tremors, and The Lazarus Man.

His film credits include: Iron Eagle, Tremors, Tremors 3: Back to Perfection, Meet the Applegates, Night of the Demons 2, and Wizards of the Lost Kingdom II, and the 1993 film titled "The Day My Parents Ran Away".

He also supplied the voice of "Dorin" in the animated television series Wildfire, and directed and wrote the 2010 short film The Broker.

Jayne has spent his adult life cultivating a career in real estate development and construction strategy expertise. Recognized as a spatial design expert, his work has been featured in the Los Angeles Times With work focused on "turn-around properties", Jayne built a company with long-time friend Donovan Bowes, RJC Design Build, Inc., which served hundreds of investment developments through construction and development.

In 1998, Jayne became a world-class blackjack player, and played blackjack professionally with a team of well-known card counters from 2000 to 2005. In his 2010 book Repeat until Rich, Josh Axelrad describes his experiences in Las Vegas with Jayne and a team of card counters as they use "Big Player" and "Call-in" tactics to win millions of dollars. Jayne became a well known player and was entered into a blacklist by the Griffin Agency, known for supplying intelligence information to casinos regarding players that can "hurt" the casino by winning money.

Under the name "Bobby J", Jayne played in the first World Series of Blackjack against such notables Stanford Wong and Hollywood Dave  It pitted some of the best and well-known blackjack players from around the world.

Personal life

Jayne's siblings, Billy Jayne, Susan Jayne, Laura Jacoby, as well as his half-brother Scott Jacoby are also actors. Jayne is of Jewish descent.

Filmography

References

External links

1973 births
Living people
American male child actors
American male film actors
American people of Jewish descent
American male television actors
American male voice actors